High Rise Donkey is a 1980 children's comedy film directed by Michael Forlong.

Synopsis
Three children stable a donkey in a high rise flat to save it from being sold as horse-meat by two small-time crooks.

Cast

Production
Sponsored by the Children's Film Foundation.
The film was classified as "universal" suitable for audiences aged four years and over.

References

External links
 

1980 films
1980s British films
1980s English-language films
British children's comedy films
Children's Film Foundation
Films directed by Michael Forlong